Cymindis pellucida is a species of ground beetle in the subfamily Harpalinae. It was described by Piochard De La Brulerie in 1875.

References

pellucida
Beetles described in 1875